CE1 may refer to:
CE1, a level of Education in France
AD 1, the year which can also be described as 1 CE and might be incorrectly described as CE1
Bayfront MRT station, Singapore